Federal Highway 147 (Carretera Federal 147) is a Federal Highway of Mexico. The highway travels from south of Tuxtepec, Oaxaca in the northwest to Palomares, Oaxaca in the southeast.

References

147